Middle Earth is the third solo studio album by Bob Catley, released by Frontiers Records in 2000.

The album draws upon J.R.R. Tolkien's The Lord of the Rings for inspiration. The original title for the album given to the music press was Lord of the Rings.

Track listing 
All songs written by Gary Hughes.

 "The Wraith of the Rings" — 7:05
 (i) "The Fields That I Recall" — 0:00(ii) "Emissary" — 0:00(iii) "The Fields That I Recall (Reprise)" — 8:02
 "City Walls" — 6:11
 "Against the Wind" — 5:15
 (i) "Where You Lead I'll Follow" — 0:00(ii) "Stormcrow and Pilgrim" — 0:00(iii) "Where You Lead I'll Follow (Reprise)" — 8:47
 "Return of the Mountain King" — 6:40
 "The End of Summer (Galadriel's Theme)" — 5:51
 "This Gallant Band of Manic Strangers" — 3:46
 "The Fellowship" — 4:23

Personnel 
 Bob Catley — vocals
 Gary Hughes — vocals, keyboards
 Vinny Burns — guitars
 Steve McKenna — bass
 John Cooksey — drums

Additional Musicians 
 Tracey Hitchings — vocals (on "Against the Wind")

Production 
 Produced by Gary Hughes
 Mixing by Audu Obaje
 Engineered by Audu Obaje, Kirk Podmore, Vinny Burns and Gary Hughes

References

External links 
 www.bobcatley.com — Official Bob Catley site

Bob Catley albums
2001 albums
Albums produced by Gary Hughes
Frontiers Records albums
Concept albums
Music based on Middle-earth